Folger is an English and German surname. Notable people with the surname include:

 Abiah Folger (1667–1752), mother of Benjamin Franklin
 Abigail Folger (1943–1969), American civil rights activist
 Alonzo Dillard Folger (1888–1941), American politician
 Charles J. Folger (1818–1884), American politician
 Dan Folger (1943–2006), American singer and songwriter
 Emily Jordan Folger (1858–1936), Shakespeare scholar
 Henry Clay Folger (1857–1930), founder of the Folger Shakespeare Library
 J. A. Folger (1835–1889), founder of the Folgers Coffee Company
 John Clifford Folger (1893–1981), United States Ambassador to Belgium (1957-59)
 John Hamlin Folger (1880–1963), American politician and lawyer, United States Secretary of the Treasury
 Jonas Folger (born 1993), German motorbike racer
 Joseph P. Folger (21st century), American professor of communication
 Mary Morrell Folger, grandmother of Benjamin Franklin, referenced in Moby Dick
 Mayhew Folger (1774–1828), American whaler and grandfather of William M. Folger
 Peter Folger (1905–1980), American businessperson
 Peter Folger (Nantucket settler) (1617–1690), Baptist missionary, teacher, and surveyor, grandfather of Benjamin Franklin
 Walter Folger Jr. (1765–1849), American politician
 William M. Folger (1844–1928), United States Navy rear admiral and grandson of Mayhew Folger

See also 
 Folger Shakespeare Library, an independent research library in Washington, D.C. established by Henry Clay Folger
 Folgers, an American coffee brand